John J. Kenney (1844 – August 7, 1893) was an American professional baseball player.

Kenney played five games during May of that season; in 19 at bats he did not get a base hit but is credited with one run batted in.

Previously he had been a regular outfielder for the Atlantics in 1867 and a substitute infielder during the next two seasons. In the first professional season, 1869, he played primarily third base in nine of 58 team games on record. Next season he was a regular outfielder and infielder for Union of Morrisania (now in the Bronx), a lesser one of fifteen professional teams in 1870.

References

Wright, Marshall (2000). The National Association of Base Ball Players, 1857-1870. Jefferson, NC: McFarland & Co. .

External links

Major League Baseball outfielders
Major League Baseball second basemen
Brooklyn Atlantics (NABBP) players
Morrisania Unions players
Brooklyn Atlantics players
19th-century baseball players
1844 births
1893 deaths
Baseball players from New York (state)
Burials at Holy Cross Cemetery, Brooklyn